Syed Mohammed Saeed Raza (1890 – 1963) was a Muslim professor and scholar.

Early life and family
Raza was born in Desna, Bihar, a village . He belonged to a family of scholars and well-educated landowners. His father, Hakim Syed Liaqat Hussian s/o Mir Baqir Sher s/o Mir Azmat Ali was an Unani physician. His cousin, Syed Sulaiman Nadvi s/o Hakim Syed Abul hasan s/o Hakim Mohammad Sher s/o Mir Azmat Ali, was a Muslim scholar, historian, and a biographer of the Islamic prophet Muhammed. His other cousin, Najeeb Asharf Nadvi s/o Syed Mohammad s/o Mir Hashim Sher s/o Mir Azmat Ali, was also a historian and writer. Raza graduated from Darul-uloom Nadwatul Ulama, one of the major Islamic schools on the Indian subcontinent.

Academic career
Raza join the staff of St. Xavier's College, Mumbai in 1922 as a professor and head of the Urdu, Arabic and Persian language departments. From 1938 to 1942, Urdu was a subject at the undergraduate level. Knowing the importance of Urdu as a language of culture and integration, the authorities made arrangements for the honours course in Urdu.

The Urdu Literary Society was established in 1944 with the object of propagating the study of the Urdu language and literature, and as such it also founded the St. Xavier's Urdu Gold Medals in 1950 for the Bachelor of Arts and Inter Arts Examinations. Raza also helped found the S. M. Saeed Raza Scholarship for college-level students.

Raza taught many famous scholars, poets and teachers during his tenure at St. Xavier's College, Mumbai. He retired from the college in 1955. After retirement, he settled back to his village, occupying his time with social work for the development of the village. He died in Desna in 1963.

Further reading
 Ek Aur Mashriqi Kutub Khana by Abdul Qavi Desnavi, Publisher, Jamiat Tulba, Desna.
 Mataihiyat (Autobiography by Abdul Qavi Desnavi).
 Bombai Se Bhopal Tek by Abdul Qavi Desnavi.

External links 
 http://theindianawaaz.com/index.php?option=com_content&view=article&id=2992&catid=12
 http://twocircles.net/2011jul08/urdu_litterateur_prof_abdul_qavi_desnavi_passes_away_bhopal.html
 Abdul Qavi Desnavi
 http://litterateurabdulqavidesnavi.blogspot.com/2012/03/abdul-qavi-desnavi-november-11930-july.html
 http://indianmuslimlegends.blogspot.com/2011/12/284-abdul-qavi-desnavi.html

1890 births
1963 deaths
People from Nalanda district
20th-century Indian educational theorists
Urdu-language writers
Indian Muslims
Urdu-language writers from India
Linguists of Urdu
20th-century Indian linguists